Nesioneta benoiti, is a species of spider of the genus Nesioneta. It is endemic to Sri Lanka.

See also
 List of Linyphiidae species

References

Linyphiidae
Arthropods of Sri Lanka
Spiders of Asia
Spiders described in 1978